Mobile World is a Pakistani magazine.

Mobile World may also refer to:

 Mobile World, an operator in the UK, now part of Talkmobile